Toft Hill is a hilltop village in County Durham, in England straggling along the A68, a few miles to the west of Bishop Auckland and adjoining the village of High Etherley. An ancient site of defensive settlement and used by the Romans, the name of Toft Hill is possibly of Norse or Angle derivation and means "Hill Hill". The village is underlaid by coal measures and saw expansion in the 19th century mining boom under the coal-owning Stobart family. The various drifts of their Carterthorne Colliery formed large extended galleries beneath the village. In recent years much of the village's archaeology has been swept away by open cast mining.

Villages in County Durham